José Alexandre da Silva Baptista (born 17 February 1941) is a Portuguese retired footballer who played as a defender.

Club career
Born in Barreiro, Setúbal District, Baptista played his entire professional career, which spanned 11 years, with Sporting CP, winning five major titles whilst being first-choice in four of those. He took the pitch as the Lisbon side defeated MTK Budapest FC to conquer the 1963–64 edition of the UEFA Cup Winners' Cup.

Baptista retired from the game at the end of the 1970–71 season, aged just 30. He remained connected to his only club, in directorial capacities.

International career
Baptista earned 11 caps for Portugal, making his debut in the Taça das Nações match against England on 4 June 1964. He participated at the 1966 FIFA World Cup finals, playing five matches for the third-placed team.

Personal life
Still as an active player, Baptista majored in economics, going on to act as commercial director for several companies.

Honours

Club
Primeira Liga: 1965–66, 1969–70
Taça de Portugal: 1962–63, 1970–71
UEFA Cup Winners' Cup: 1963–64

International
Portugal
FIFA World Cup third place: 1966

See also
List of one-club men

References

External links

1941 births
Living people
Sportspeople from Barreiro, Portugal
Portuguese footballers
Association football defenders
Primeira Liga players
Sporting CP footballers
Portugal international footballers
1966 FIFA World Cup players